Samokov is a small village located in the region of Porece in the municipality of Makedonski Brod, North Macedonia. It used to be a municipality of its own and its FIPS code was MK89.

Demographics
In statistics gathered by Vasil Kanchov in 1900, the village of Samokov was inhabited by 5 Muslim Albanians, among whom was the mudur of Poreče. 

According to the 2002 census, the village had a total of 388 inhabitants. Ethnic groups in the village include:

Macedonians 388

References

Villages in Makedonski Brod Municipality